Pseudomeges marmoratus is a species of beetle in the family Cerambycidae. It was described by John O. Westwood in 1848, originally under the genus Hammaticherus. It is known from India, Bhutan, and Myanmar. It feeds on Quercus griffithii.

References

Lamiini
Beetles described in 1848